The Book of Love is the 14th studio album by British/Australian soft rock duo Air Supply, released in 1997. The album was a serious attempt for the band to penetrate the charts, mainly focusing on mature adult contemporary songs.
 
Though the album didn't have any chart entries, the singles "So Much Love" and "When I Say" have gained critical acclaim in USA, although in Asia the single "Strong Strong Wind" was a big hit. The latter song was also recorded by the American band Heart for their 1998 compilation Greatest Hits.

The writing of songs on the album began during their Asian tour on 1995, with the song "Mother Said" being demonstrated by Graham Russell at their room in a hotel on Taipei, Taiwan. It was showned at their interactive CD-ROM titled As Close As This.

Track listing
All songs written by Graham Russell, except where noted.
"The Book of Love" - 4:50
"Strong, Strong Wind" (Diane Warren) - 4:21
"So Much Love" (Russell, Tom Evans) - 4:14
"When I Say" - 5:27
"We the People" (Russell, Mark Williams) - 3:41
"Once" (Jed Moss, Russell) - 4:59
"Let's Stay Together Tonight" (Clifford Rehrig, Russell, Noble Williams) - 7:56
"Daybreak" - 4:28
"Mother Said" - 3:15
"Would You Ever Walk Away" - 3:58
"All That You Want" (Guy Allison, Russell) - 3:51

Personnel 

Air Supply
 Russell Hitchcock – lead vocals (2, 3, 6–9), backing vocals (2, 8, 9)
 Graham Russell – keyboards (1), programming (1), acoustic guitar (1), lead vocals (2, 4, 6, 8, 9), backing vocals (2, 8, 9), guitar (3, 6, 9, 10), harp (8), drum programming (10)

Additional musicians
 Jed Moss – acoustic piano (1, 2, 3, 5, 7, 8)
 Randy Kerber – keyboards (2, 4, 5, 8), strings (7)
 John Philip Shenale – strings (3), keyboards (6)
 Guy Allison – keyboards (6, 9, 10), drum programming (10)
 Rex Goh – electric guitar (1), guitar (2, 4, 6, 10)
 Larry Antonio – bass (1)
 Abraham Laboriel – bass (1, 2, 4)
 Clifford Rehrig – bass (3, 6, 8, 9)
 Mark T. Williams – drums (2, 3, 4, 6, 9), keyboards (4), percussion (4)
 Rafael Padilla – percussion (2, 3, 9, 10)
 Paulinho da Costa – percussion (4)
 The Beejeagles (Russell Hitchcock, Graham Russell and Michael Sherwood) – lead vocals (1), backing vocals (1, 3, 4, 6, 7, 10)
 The Waters Family (Julia Waters, Luther Waters, Maxine Waters Willard and Oren Waters) – backing vocals (4)

Production 
 Producer – Graham Russell
 Engineer and Mixing – Alejandro Rodriguez
 Assistant Engineer – Tony Meador
 Mix Assistants – Tony Meador and Jeff Robinette
 Mastered by Bob Ludwig at Gateway Mastering (Portland, ME)
 Art Direction and Design – Lyn Bradley
 Stylist – Xavier Cabrera
 Photography – Michael Wilson

References

1997 albums
Air Supply albums
Giant Records (Warner) albums
Albums produced by Graham Russell